The Slovakia women's national ball hockey team is the women's national ball hockey team of Slovakia, and a member of the International Street and Ball Hockey Federation (ISBHF).

History
The team has competed in every Women’s Ball Hockey World Championship since its inception in 2007, which was hosted in the Slovakian city of Ratingen. Slovakia would also serve as host country in 2011, with games contested in Bratislava. At the 2011 Worlds, Slovakia would capture its first-ever gold medal, defeating Canada in a 1-0 final.

World Championships

Awards and honors
Ivana Gajdosova, Defense:, 2013 Ball Hockey World Championship  
Petra Pavlovicova, Best Defender: 2013 Ball Hockey World Championship 
Zuzana Tomcikova, Goaltender 2013 Ball Hockey World Championship All-Star Team
Zuzana Tomcikova, Top Goaltender 2017 Ball Hockey World Championship

References

External links 
 inbhf.com

Ball hockey
Ball hockey